Cathaemasiidae is a family of flatworms belonging to the order Plagiorchiida.

Genera:
 Cathaemasia Looss, 1899
 Cathaemasioides Teixeira de Freitas, 1941
 Pulchrosoma Travassos, 1916
 Reesella Mettrick, 1956

References

Platyhelminthes